Éric Charden (born Jacques-André Puissant ; 15 October 1942 – 29 April 2012) was a French singer and songwriter, best known for his collaborations with singer Stone who they formed band Stone et Charden.

Éric Charden was born in Haiphong, Vietnam, during World War II. He is from a French father (who was a port engineer in France and overseas) and a Tibetan mother. He moved to Marseille, France, in 1950 with his mother (his father returned to France in 1954) and graduated with a Baccalauréat from HEC Paris in 1960.

He alongside Annie Gautrat were both decorated with the honorable Legion of Honour on 1 January 2012 just months before his death from cancer at age 69.

References

1942 births
2012 deaths
Vietnamese emigrants to France
French people of Tibetan descent
Deaths from lymphoma
Deaths from cancer in France
Decca Records artists
London Records artists
20th-century French male singers
French male singer-songwriters